David F. DeCoste is a member of the Massachusetts House of Representatives. DeCoste is a Republican who first represented the Fifth Plymouth District (Hanover, Rockland, and his hometown of Norwell) in 2014.

See also
 2019–2020 Massachusetts legislature
 2021–2022 Massachusetts legislature

References

Living people
Year of birth missing (living people)
People from Norwell, Massachusetts
Republican Party members of the Massachusetts House of Representatives
21st-century American politicians